Malanda is a surname. Notable people with the surname include:

 Adilson Malanda (born 2001), French footballer
 Guslagie Malanda (born 1990), French actress
 Junior Malanda (1994–2015), Belgian footballer

Surnames of Congolese origin